Shirin Gerami (born ) is Iran's first female triathlete competing in a world championship. On 15 September 2013, Gerami raced the triathlon championship in London while garbed in full Islamic dress. She has designed a range of sportswear to inspire other Iranian women to participate in sports.

Personal life 
Gerami was born in Iran, and lived in England for 11 years, with time spent in the U.S.A. and the Middle East. She studied for A-levels at Lancing College and then graduated with a degree in politics, philosophy and economics from Durham University.

Recognition 
In 2016 Gerami was chosen as one of the BBC 100 Women.

Competition 
 Triathlon World Champions, London, U.K., 15 September 2013.
 Ironman World Championships, Kona, Hawaii, U.S.A., 9 October 2016

References

External links 
 

Year of birth missing (living people)
Living people
Iranian female triathletes
People educated at Lancing College
BBC 100 Women
Alumni of St Chad's College, Durham